Kačulice is a village in the municipality of Čačak in the Moravica District of Serbia. The village is approximately 15 km east of the city of Čačak, and has a population of less than 700.

References

External links
 Kačulice

Populated places in Moravica District